Tail value at risk (TVaR), also known as tail conditional expectation (TCE) or conditional tail expectation (CTE), is a risk measure associated with the more general value at risk. It quantifies the expected value of the loss given that an event outside a given probability level has occurred.

Background

There are a number of related, but subtly different, formulations for TVaR in the literature. A common case in literature is to define TVaR and average value at risk as the same measure. Under some other settings, TVaR is the conditional expectation of loss above a given value, whereas the expected shortfall is the product of this value with the probability of it occurring. The former definition may not be a coherent risk measure in general, however it is coherent if the underlying distribution is continuous. The latter definition is a coherent risk measure. TVaR accounts for the severity of the failure, not only the chance of failure. The TVaR is a measure of the expectation only in the tail of the distribution.

Mathematical definition
The canonical tail value at risk is the left-tail (large negative values) in some disciplines and the right-tail (large positive values) in other, such as actuarial science. This is usually due to the differing conventions of treating losses as large negative or positive values. Using the negative value convention, Artzner and others define the tail value at risk as:

Given a random variable  which is the payoff of a portfolio at some future time and given a parameter  then the tail value at risk is defined by
 

Typically the payoff random variable  is in some Lp-space where  to guarantee the existence of the expectation.

Formulas for continuous probability distributions 

Closed-form formulas exist for calculating TVaR when the payoff of a portfolio  or a corresponding loss  follows a specific continuous distribution. If  follows some probability distribution with the probability density function (p.d.f.)  and the cumulative distribution function (c.d.f.) , the left-tail TVaR can be represented as

For engineering or actuarial applications it is more common to consider the distribution of losses , in this case the right-tail TVaR is considered (typically for  95% or 99%):

.

Since some formulas below were derived for the left-tail case and some for the right-tail case, the following reconciliations can be useful:

Normal distribution 

Generalized Student's t-distribution 

Laplace distribution 

Logistic distribution 

Exponential distribution 

Pareto distribution 

Generalized Pareto distribution (GPD) 

Weibull distribution 

Generalized extreme value distribution (GEV) 

Generalized hyperbolic secant (GHS) distribution 

Johnson's SU-distribution 

Burr type XII distribution 
If the payoff of a portfolio  follows the Burr type XII distribution with the p.d.f.  and the c.d.f. Alternatively, .

Dagum distribution 
If the payoff of a portfolio  follows the Dagum distribution with the p.d.f.  and the c.d.f.

Lognormal distribution 
If the payoff of a portfolio  follows lognormal distribution, i.e. the random variable  follows normal distribution with the p.d.f.

Log-logistic distribution 
If the payoff of a portfolio  follows log-logistic distribution, i.e. the random variable  follows logistic distribution with the p.d.f.

As the incomplete beta function is defined only for positive arguments, for a more generic case the left-tail TVaR can be expressed with the hypergeometric function: .

If the loss of a portfolio  follows log-logistic distribution with p.d.f.  and c.d.f.

Log-Laplace distribution 
If the payoff of a portfolio  follows log-Laplace distribution, i.e. the random variable  follows Laplace distribution the p.d.f.

Log-generalized hyperbolic secant (log-GHS) distribution 
If the payoff of a portfolio  follows log-GHS distribution, i.e. the random variable  follows GHS distribution with the p.d.f.

References

Actuarial science
Financial risk modeling
Monte Carlo methods in finance